Roland Niedermair is an Italian luger who competed during the 1990s. A natural track luger, he won the bronze medal in the men's doubles event at the 1994 FIL World Luge Natural Track Championships in Gsies, Italy.

Niedermair also won a silver medal in the men's doubles event at the 1991 FIL European Luge Natural Track Championships in Völs am Schlern, Italy.

References
Natural track European Championships results 1970-2006.
Natural track World Championships results: 1979-2007

Italian lugers
Italian male lugers
Living people
Year of birth missing (living people)
Sportspeople from Südtirol